Dibis District is a district in Kirkuk Governorate, Iraq. Its administrative center is the town of Dibis. The largest settlement is Altun Kupri.

Altun Kupri subdistrict is predominantly Turkmen. Sargaran subdistrict has a Kurdish majority with an Arab minority. Markaz Dibis subdistrict has a Kurdish majority with Arab, Turkmen, and Christian minorities.

References

Districts of Kirkuk Province